The Gilbey Baronetcy, of Elsenham Hall in the County of Essex, is a title in the Baronetage of the United Kingdom. It was created on 4 September 1893 for the wine-merchant, stock-breeder, agriculturalist and philanthropist Walter Gilbey. He was chairman and co-founder of W. & A. Gilbey, wine merchants and distillers. The second Baronet was also Chairman of the family firm, as well as an influential figure in horse-breeding and sports.

Gilbey baronets, of Elsenham Hall (1893)

Sir Walter Gilbey, 1st Baronet (1831–1914)
Sir (Henry) Walter Gilbey, 2nd Baronet (1859–1945)
Sir (Walter) Derek Gilbey, 3rd Baronet (1913–1991)
Sir (Walter) Gavin Gilbey, 4th Baronet (born 1949)

References

Charles Kidd & David Williamson (editors), Debrett's Peerage and Baronetage (1990 edition). New York: St Martin's Press, 1990.
Alec Waugh, Merchants of Wine: Being a Centenary Account of the Fortunes of the House of Gilbey. London: Cassell, 1957.

Gilbey